Scholastica is a private English medium school in Dhaka, Bangladesh, offering pre-school to A level courses. It was founded in 1977 by businesswoman and former advisor to the government, Yasmeen Murshed. The school follows the Cambridge International Curriculum set by the Cambridge Assessment International Education for Grade 9 to 12 and offers the GCE O Level,
GCE AS  Level and the GCE A Level qualifications. 
It is prominently recognised as one of the elite schools of Bangladesh, boasting a strong alumni network.

History
Scholastica was set up in 1977 to meet the demands for schools having English as the medium of instruction but emphasising equal proficiency in Bengali.

In January 2001, the senior classes moved into new premises.

Campus

Scholastica's junior, middle and senior campuses are housed in the Dhaka neighbourhoods of Dhanmondi, Gulshan, Banani, Uttara and Mirpur.

The Uttara campus was built in 2000. It accommodates classes 3 to 12 in classrooms across its seven-storeyed compound. STM Hall is an auditorium which is used as a gymnasium and is named after Yasmeen Murshed's husband, Syed Tanveer Murshed.

Scholastica has opened a campus in Mirpur.

Curriculum
Scholastica offers a complete primary, elementary, secondary and high school program leading to the General Certificate of Education examinations which are conducted by the British Council in Dhaka.

Since the 2008–09 academic session, the school's O and A Level examinations have been administered by Cambridge Assessment International Education, replacing the Edexcel system of schooling.

Activities

Laboratory
Laboratory facilities are provided for all the science classes. The senior laboratories are inspected and approved by the representatives of the University of London to meet its standard for the practical requirement of the 'O' and 'A' Level examinations.

Extra-curricular activities
Scholastica extra-curricular activities include drama, debating and public speaking. The school also offers a large number of both teacher and student run clubs. School teams participate in inter-school and national competitions. Theatrical presentations are performed in English and Bengali, and it is well known for its annual dramas. Several after-school programs are offered beginning in middle school.

The school is also famous for its renowned Model United Nations conferences, known as "SCHOMUN" in its Uttara Branch and "SMUN" in its Mirpur Branch. The school is also known for hosting the Scholastica Business Summit or "SBS."

Notable alumni
 Wasfia Nazreen, first Bangladeshi and Bengali to the complete the Seven Summits record
 Shazia Omar, Bangladeshi English-language novelist
 Tulip Siddiq, British Member of Parliament and granddaughter of the Father of the nation of Bangladesh, Sheikh Mujibur Rahman.
Iresh Zaker, a Bangladeshi advertising executive, television and film actor and a musician.

 Korvi Rakshand, a Bangladeshi entrepreneur and social worker, founder of the JAAGO Foundation.
 Shah Rafayat Chowdhury, Founder of Footsteps Bangladesh

References

External links
 Scholastica

Cambridge schools in Bangladesh
Schools in Dhaka District
Educational institutions established in 1977
1977 establishments in Bangladesh
Schools in Dhaka
Scholastica (school)